The North Carolina Growers Association (NCGA) is a -profit growers' cooperative based in the United States state of North Carolina that helps farmers in the state get native born US Citizens work as temporary agricultural laborers.

History
NCGA was started by Stan Eury in 1989 in response to the formal creation of the H-2A guest worker program in 1986 and the difficulties farmers faced effectively utilizing the program and ensuring that they were in compliance. In 2004, the NCGA signed its first union contract covering 8,500 guest workers from Mexico.

Reception and controversy

Reception as a stakeholder in liberalizing agricultural guest worker programs
The NCGA has often been quoted in news media articles on the claimed need for foreign temporary agricultural labor in the United States, and the importance of expanding the H-2A visa, with farm worker unions such as United Farm Workers cited for counterpoint. The H-2A program, and the way the NCGA uses it, have also been critiqued in publications such as Mother Jones.

Economist Michael Clemens at the Center for Global Development cited data from the NCGA, and also spoke with the association, while doing research on the H-2A visa for a policy paper. In a blog post, Clemens cited NCGA numbers: 250 Americans applied for the 7000 agricultural job openings of the NCGA, of whom 70 showed up for work and five completed the season. Clemens' paper was released by the Partnership for a New American Economy and blogged about by Michael Bloomberg and separately by Dylan Matthews for the Washington Post. The study was critiqued by North Carolina Policy Watch, that claimed that the reason the NCGA failed to hire Americans was because the state agencies they went through were apathetic to the process, rather than due to a genuine shortage of American workers.

Clashes with labor unions and migrant rights groups
The NCGA has had an acrimonious relationships with labor unions as well as some migrant rights and worker rights organizations, including Human Rights Watch and Legal Services Corporation.

Media coverage
NCGA has been covered in the New York Times, Wall Street Journal, Forbes, and Time Magazine.

See also
 Western Growers Association

References

External links

Agricultural organizations based in the United States
Agrarian politics
1989 establishments in North Carolina